The Royal Borough of Kensington and Chelsea, an Inner London borough, has responsibility for some of the parks and open spaces within its boundaries. Most of them are relatively small: many are the typical London square, built to service the houses around that square. Two of the larger open spaces both form part of the "Magnificent Seven" cemeteries, being those at Brompton and Kensal Green. The parks are policed by the Royal Borough of Kensington and Chelsea Parks Police.

Some of the other open spaces in the Borough are:

 Addison Gardens
 Albert Bridge Garden
 Alec Clifton-Taylor Memorial Gardens
 Alexander Square (North and South)
 All Saints Churchyard and St Thomas More Gardens
 Allen Hall Seminary Garden
 Arundel and Elgin Communal Garden
 Arundel and Ladbroke Gardens
 Ashburn Gardens
 Ashburn Place Gardens
 Avondale Park
 Avondale Park Gardens
 Barkston Gardens
 Barlby Gardens
 Battersea Bridge Gardens
 Bina Gardens East
 Bina Gardens West
 Blenheim and Elgin Crescents Garden
 Bolton Gardens
 Chelsea Embankment Gardens
 Chelsea Physic Garden
 Emslie Horniman's Pleasance
 Grand Union Canal (Paddington Branch): along the towpath
 Holland Park: here there is an Ecology centre
 Kensington Gardens
 Little Wormwood Scrubs
 Lots Road Park
 Ranelagh Gardens
 Royal Hospital Chelsea: the grounds of which are used by the annual Chelsea Flower Show
 Yalta Memorial Garden: A small garden between Cromwell Gardens and Thurloe Square, SW7. It contains the Twelve Responses to Tragedy memorial.
The area has the additional advantage of extending into Kensington Gardens and thus neighboring Hyde Park.

Little Wormwood Scrubs is one of 11 parks throughout Greater London chosen to receive money for redevelopment by a public vote in 2009. The park received £400,000 towards better footpaths, more lighting, refurbished public toilets and new play areas for children.

See also
Royal Parks of London

References

External links
Parks and open spaces